The 2019 BC Lions season was the 62nd season for the team in the Canadian Football League (CFL) and their 66th overall. The Lions were eliminated from post-season contention following a week 18 loss to the Edmonton Eskimos on October 12, 2019.

The Lions played without Wally Buono as head coach or general manager for the first time since the 2002 season following his final appearance last year. Buono was replaced as head coach by DeVone Claybrooks, who entered his first season as a head coach and is the 26th head coach in franchise history. Current general manager, Ed Hervey, who was in his second season in that role.

The Lions held their training camp at Hillside Stadium in Kamloops, British Columbia for the tenth straight year.

Claybrooks was fired as head coach after one season on November 6, 2019.

Offseason

Foreign drafts
For the first time in its history, the CFL held drafts for foreign players from Mexico and Europe. Like all other CFL teams, the Lions held three non-tradeable selections in the 2019 CFL–LFA Draft, which took place on January 14, 2019. The 2019 European CFL Draft took place on April 11, 2019 where all teams held one non-tradeable pick.

CFL draft
The 2019 CFL Draft took place on May 2, 2019. The Lions traded their first-round pick in 2019 to Winnipeg for a first round pick in 2018. The Lions exchanged their second-round pick for Tyrell Sutton and a third-round pick and they traded their third-round pick for Davon Coleman and a sixth-round pick.

Preseason

Schedule

 Games played with colour uniforms.

Regular season

Standings

Schedule

 Games played with colour uniforms.
 Games played with white uniforms.

Team

Roster

Coaching staff

References

External links
 

BC Lions seasons
2019 Canadian Football League season by team
2019 in British Columbia